Patrick Alasdair Fionn Turner
(19 October 1969 – 6 October 2011) was a British-born scientist, who played a major role in the VR Centre for the Built Environment and the Space group at the University College London. His contribution had a great impact on the development of space syntax theory. This goes in parallel to his research into introducing a dynamic agent model that derives aggregate spatial analysis from the visual affordances of the built environment. Based on the principles of Turner's theory on Embodied space, his agent model proves to correlate well with natural movement behavior in architectural and urban environments.
Turner was born on 19 October 1969, in London. He earned an MA in Natural Sciences from the University of Cambridge, and an MSc in Artificial Intelligence from the University of Edinburgh. Turner was last appointed a reader in Urban and Architectural Computing at the University College London in 2011.
Turner died on 6 October 2011 after a long struggle with stomach cancer.

Research 

Alasdair is a computer scientist whose interests were focused on the interface between the domain of architecture and urban design and the underlying systems that comprise their socio-physical dimensions. He looked for dynamic models that evolve through the process of structural coupling between the man as a vision-driven agent and the background environment. Agents are seen to have two different patterns of movement; a natural movement and a navigational movement. Natural movement is suggested to be the simple product of Agents’ vision and the spatial affordances of the built environment. Navigational movement is the pattern of movement that agents learn by retrieving their spatial memory and implementing that into their navigational decisions with the purpose to reach a certain destination point. Agents are adapted to learn through introducing a neural network method to control their movement behaviour. Alasdair aimed at implementing these methods into building evolutionary design model to reflect on an emergent Ecomorphic model. The model evolves a relationship between the collective patterns of movement by agents and the formation of the environment. In the model he developed with Alan Penn, the environment has an underlying Exosomatic visual architecture (that is, a paradigm of vision that holds for configurational affordances in the environment and outside the body which guide movement decisions). He understands the spatial affordances of the environment as the possibilities for vision and movement in space. Constrained by these affordances, agents’ movement is driven by vision and enabled by access.

Alasdair’s work on spatial analysis constitutes the foundation of the agent model and supports research in space syntax theory. The theory was initially established by Bill Hillier and Julienne Hanson in their book The Social Logic of Space. Space syntax theory was based on a graph-based representation of the spatial network in buildings and cities and what this implies in terms of the social logic of movement and occupation. The nodes in the graph representation are namely the axial lines and convex spaces. Together with Alan Penn, David O'Sullivan and Maria Doxa, Alasdair has introduced to visibility graph analysis (VGA). A VGA is another representation of space that reflects on intervisibility relationships in a layout. In a VGA model, nodes are considered to be points in a grid that covers all spaces in a layout. Alasdair has also contributed to the development of space syntax methods. Together with Alan Penn and Bill Hillier, he has written an algorithm to generate axial maps automatically. He has also contributed to the introduction of segment graph measures and the development of geometric configurations. Segment analysis was seen by Bill Hillier and Shinichi Iida to have some explanatory power by considering angular and metric graph properties of street networks and their psychological effects. The method was mainly applied to studies on urban systems. Alasdair has written the UCL Depthmap software in which he implemented space syntax methods as well as the agent model.

Alasdair's interests go beyond science and architecture towards art and generative code explorations. Being the founder of the MSc Adaptive Architecture and Computation course at UCL, he taught programming for architecture and creative design. For that, he used Processing; an open source Java-based programming language.

See also 

 Spatial network
 Spatial network analysis software
 Visibility graph analysis

References

External links 
 personal Web page at the VR Centre for the Built Environment
 profile for the MSc Adaptive Architecture and Computation course
 profile for the Vision@UCL program

1969 births
2011 deaths
Computer scientists
Alumni of the University of Edinburgh